Where Are You My Love, That I Cannot Find You? (Spanish language: ¿Dónde estás amor de mi vida que no te puedo encontrar?) is a 1992  Argentine drama film directed by Juan José Jusid and co-written with Ana María Shua. The film stars Susú Pecoraro, Oscar Martínez, Fernando Siro, Luisina Brando, Mario Pasik and Jessica Schultz, as well as Vando Villamil in a small role.

Synopsis 
The film shows the encounters and romances of several characters who seek love counsel through  the eponymous late-night radio talk-show, conducted by Octavio (Siro). Octavio sets up blind dates among the characters, mainly advising Sarah (Pecoraro), a thirty-something loner who is hooked up with Fernandez (Martínez), a shy, introverted man who still lives with his father. Their relationship is chronicled through a series of episodes, involving Martínez' affair with a spiritist (Schultz), Sarah's entanglement with a psychopath and a subplot involving Sarah's strong-willed but ultimately broken and suicidal friend, Tina (Brando).

Sarah, worn-out after so much frustrated relationships and hopeless cases, decides to kill herself and takes an overdose of sleeping pills. Martínez arrives just in time to get her to a hospital and save her, whereupon Octavio happily announces their engagement through the radio.

References

External links
 
1992 films
1990s Spanish-language films
1992 drama films
Argentine drama films
1990s Argentine films